Wang Yong (born February 1957) is a former Chinese politician who spent his entire career in both Shandong and Hainan provinces. He was investigated by China's top anti-graft agency in July 2020. Previously he served as vice-chairman of the Hainan Provincial Committee of the Chinese People's Political Consultative Conference (CPPCC). He entered the workforce in January 1973, and joined the Chinese Communist Party in July 1976. He was a delegate to the 12th National People's Congress.

Early life and education
Wang was born in Yanggu County, Shandong, in February 1957. During the late Cultural Revolution, he briefly worked as a sent-down youth in the whole of 1973. In December 1973, he attended Yanggu County No.1 High School. A year and a half later, he became a sent-down youth again and worked until December 1976, when he joined the Liaocheng Electric Machinery Factory as a worker and political work official. After the resumption of college entrance examination, in September 1978, he was admitted to Beizhen Normal College, where he majored in Chinese.

Career in Shandong
After graduating in June 1980, he became an official in the Organization Department of Huimin County. Ten months later, he was promoted to deputy secretary of Yanggu County Committee of the Communist Youth League of China. Subsequently, he worked in the Organization Department of Shandong Provincial Committee of the Communist Youth League of China from September 1983 to February 1987, and he served as both deputy head of the Organization Department and the United Front Work Department between February 1987 and April 1991.

Career in Hainan
In August 1991, he was transferred to south China's Hainan Island and appointed secretary of the Discipline Inspection Commission of Hainan Machinery Industry Corporation. Three months later, he concurrently served as deputy party chief. After the institutional reform as Hainan Machinery Industry Bureau, he served as deputy director in March 1993. In July 1996, he was assigned to Hainan Social Security Bureau as deputy director, a position he held until February 2000. After a month as assistant inspector of the Department of Personnel and Labor Security, he was promoted to become party chief of Chengmai County. It would be his first job as "first-in-charge" of a county. During his term in office, he studied at the Central Party School of the Chinese Communist Party as a part-time student. He was head and party branch secretary of the Hainan Provincial Transport Department in February 2005, and held that office until November 2008. During his tenure, he studied economic management at the Central Party School of the Chinese Communist Party and public management at senior classes started jointly by Tsinghua University and Harvard University. He was appointed deputy party chief of Sanya in September 2008, concurrently holding the mayor position. In this position, he studied business administration at Cheung Kong Graduate School of Business and attended a training class for young and middle aged cadres run by the Central Party School of the Chinese Communist Party. In October 2014, he became head of the United Front Work Department of CPC Hainan Provincial Committee, but having held the position for only more than a year. In January 2016, he rose to become vice-chairman of the Hainan Provincial Committee of the Chinese People's Political Consultative Conference (CPPCC).

Investigation
On July 13, 2020, he was put under investigation for alleged "serious violations of discipline and laws" by the Central Commission for Discipline Inspection (CCDI), the party's internal disciplinary body, and the National Supervisory Commission, the highest anti-corruption agency of China. 

On January 11, 2021, he has been expelled from the CCP and dismissed from public office. On May 13, he stood trial at the Intermediate People's Court of Guilin on charges of taking bribes. According to the indictment, he allegedly took advantage of his positions in Hainan to seek benefits for others in project approval and contracting and career promotions between 2000 and 2014. He was charged with accepting money and property worth about 90.5 million yuan ($14.1 million) either by himself or through some of his close relatives. On October 28, he was sentenced to life imprisonment for taking bribes worth about 90.5 million yuan ($14.1 million). The money and property that Wang had received in the form of bribes, as well as any interest arising from them, will be turned over to the national treasury.

References 

1957 births
Living people
People from Yanggu County, Shandong
Central Party School of the Chinese Communist Party alumni
Cheung Kong Graduate School of Business alumni
People's Republic of China politicians from Shandong
Chinese Communist Party politicians from Shandong
Delegates to the 12th National People's Congress
Expelled members of the Chinese Communist Party